Justin Butler (born 23 March 2001) is a German professional footballer who plays as a forward for FC Ingolstadt.

Club career
After playing youth football for FC Augsburg, Butler joined Bayern Munich's academy in 2016. Butler made his debut for Bayern Munich II on 29 October 2018, coming on as a late substitute in a 2–1 win over Wacker Burghausen. He joined FC Ingolstadt 04 in 2019, and made his debut on 24 June 2020, coming on as a substitute in a 2–0 win against Waldhof Mannheim, before making his second and final appearance of the season in a 2–0 defeat to 1. FC Magdeburg on 1 July 2020. He also made one appearance for FC Ingolstadt 04 II in a 5–1 defeat to TSV 1880 Wasserburg on 11 October 2019.

In January 2022 Butler moved to 3. Liga club Waldhof Mannheim on loan for the rest of the 2021–22 season.

International career
Born in Augsburg, Germany, Butler is also eligible to represent the United States and has previously taken part in a training camp with the United States under-18 team.

References

External links
 
 

2001 births
Living people
German footballers
German people of African-American descent
Sportspeople of American descent
Citizens of the United States through descent
American soccer players
African-American soccer players
Sportspeople from Augsburg
Footballers from Bavaria
Association football forwards
FC Bayern Munich II players
FC Ingolstadt 04 II players
FC Ingolstadt 04 players
SV Waldhof Mannheim players
2. Bundesliga players
3. Liga players
Regionalliga players
Oberliga (football) players